New York EP is the debut extended play (EP) by American rapper Angel Haze released on December 11, 2012 by Republic Records featuring the single "New York". It charted at #58 on the UK Singles Chart.

The EP, released on Republic Records, was made available for digital download on October 5, 2012 in the UK and on December 11, 2012 in the United States and is composed of tracks from their previously released mixtapes.

Track listing

References 

2012 debut EPs
Angel Haze albums
Republic Records EPs
Hip hop EPs